Lalish (also known as Lalişa Nûranî) is a mountain valley and temple in Shekhan, Duhok Governorate in Iraq. It is the holiest temple of the Yazidis. It is the location of the tomb of the Sheikh Adi ibn Musafir, a central figure of the Yazidi faith. 

The temple is above the town of Shekhan, which had the second largest population of Yazidi prior to the persecution of Yazidis by ISIL. The temple is about sixty kilometers north of Mosul and 14 kilometers west from the village Ayn Sifna. The temple is built at about 1,000 meters above sea level and situated among three mountains, Hizrat in the west, Misat in the south and Arafat in the north.

At least once in their lifetimes, Yazidis are expected to make a six-day pilgrimage to Lalish to visit the tomb of Şêx Adî and other sacred places. These other sacred places are shrines dedicated to other holy beings. There are two sacred springs called Zamzam and the Kaniya Spî (White Spring). Below Sheikh Adi's sanctuary, which also includes the tomb of Sheikh Hesen is situated a cave.   

Lalish is also the location of pirrā selāt (Ṣerāṭ Bridge) and a mountain called Mt. ʿErefāt which has sites significant in other faiths. Yazidis living in the region are also expected to make a yearly pilgrimage to attend the autumn seven-day Feast of the Assembly, which is celebrated between 6th and 13th of October.

It has been located in the Shekhan District since 1991.

History

Lalish Temple dates back about 4000 years.

In the early 12th century, Adi ibn Mosāfer moved to Lalish. Adi died in 1162 and was buried. During a major battle against the Yazidi in 1415, the tomb of Adi was razed.

The Lalish valley was annexed in 1892 by the surrounding Muslim tribes under the leadership of Ottomans, the mausoleum of Yezidi saints were looted and damaged and the Lalish Temple was converted into a Quranic school. The occupation of the temple eventually led to a fierce and widespread rebellion by Yezidis of Shekhan and Shingal against the Ottomans and the neighbouring Muslim Kurdish tribes. It was not until 1904 that the Ezidis, under the leadership of Mîr Alî Beg, succeeded in forcibly recovering their temple and driving out the Muslims.

Beginning on 3 August 2014, Yazidi refugees fled from Sinjar and took shelter in the temple after the Islamic State of Iraq and the Levant placed Sinjar and its environs under siege. When some 50,000 Yezidis trapped on Sinjar Mountain were freed by way of a land corridor opened by the Peoples's Protection Units (YPG) and Kurdistan Workers' Party (PKK), the majority fled through Syria and circled around the north of the Sinjar mountain range to reach Lalish and Shekhan in Kurdistan Region.

See also 
Genocide of Yazidis by ISIL
Yazidi Black Book
Yazidism
Yazidis in Iraq
List of Yazidi holy places

References

Valleys of Asia
Nineveh Governorate
Yazidi holy places
Yazidi populated places in Iraq
Pilgrimage sites
Kurdish words and phrases